The Royal St. John's Regatta is North America's oldest annual sporting event with documented proof of 1816 boat races.  There is credible contention that St. John's regattas were held even earlier than 1816, likely in the 18th century. The races of 1818 were held on September 22 in order to coincide with the 57th anniversary of King George III's official coronation on September 22, 1761. It is from this date that the Regatta Committee takes its anniversary. In August 2018 the Royal St. John's Regatta celebrated its 200th anniversary. 

Held on Quidi Vidi Lake in St. John's, Newfoundland, the Regatta is scheduled for the first Wednesday of August. If weather and wind conditions are not suitable, the event is postponed until the next suitable day. Since Regatta Day is a civic holiday in St. John's (replacing the Civic Holiday observed in most other Canadian provinces on the first Monday in August), this means that the weather actually determines whether or not workers have the day off – a matter sometimes complicated by late-night partying associated with the end of the George Street Festival the night before. This has led to the coining of the term "Regatta Roulette" where people head to George Street Festival or party elsewhere the night before and hope the weather is nice enough for the Regatta (and the holiday) the next day. 

Crews row six-member, coxswained, fixed-seat racing shells that are as identical as possible and are the property of the Royal St. John's Regatta Committee. Men's crews row a 2.450 km course, women's row a 1.225 km course, and all crews are required to turn buoys and return to the start-finish line. 

A growing number of people, local and foreign, visit Quidi Vidi Lake each year for the event, averaging around 50,000 in recent years. It has also become a popular spot for both provincial and federal politicians to meet the public. Aside from the rowing competitions, the Royal St. John's Regatta is well known for its lakeside entertainment.  The Regatta host hundreds of booths operated by individuals and organizations, ranging from various games of chance to food and drink.

History
There are records of rowing competitions in St. John's since at least 1816.

The regatta has long-standing ties with the Canadian monarchy: The regatta has been visited by members of the Royal Family, including Prince Albert Edward (later King Edward) in 1860 and Queen Elizabeth II in 1978. It has been cancelled due to the death of any monarch, and any year a coronation has taken place or a milestone jubilee celebrated, the regatta has been held in honour of the monarch. Its royal designation was incorporated in 1993, which prompted changes in the event and the development of a new crest. Don Johnson, Frederick Russell and Geoff Carnell collaborated in the effort to get permission to use the Royal prefix for the Regatta.

The first women's race in the St. John's Regatta was held in 1856. The winning crew of Quidi Vidi women was inducted into the Regatta Hall of Fame in recognition of their feat. It was nearly 100 years before women participated again. Beginning in 1949, women have rowed in nearly every Regatta, though a women's championship race was not introduced until 1979.

Course records and record holders

Male Course Record: 8:51.32 (Crosbie Industrial Services 2007 - Championship Race)

Members:

Cox: Mark Hayward

Stroke: Brent Hickey

5: Adam Kavanagh

4: Ron Witten

3: Ed Williams

2: James Cadigan

1: Darryl Ryan

Coach: Bert Hickey

Female Course Record: 4:56.10 (M5 2018 - Amateur Race)

Members:

Cox: Dean Hammond

Stroke: Katie Wadden

5: Alyssa Devereaux

4: Jane Brodie

3: Nancy Beaton

2: Amanda Ryan

1: Amanda Hancock

Spare: Maria Clift

Course Record Progression

Male

Female

Official Race Record Times

Female

Male

Championship

Championship Crews / Times

Male

Female

Other events
Regatta Day is only officially recognized as a holiday in the city of St. John's and most retail establishments outside the city remain open that day. Some larger suburban stores mark the day with extravagant Boxing Day-style sales.

See also
 List of Canadian organizations with royal patronage
 St. John's, Newfoundland and Labrador
 Monarchy of Canada

References

External links
 Royal St. John's Regatta Official Webpage

Holidays in Newfoundland and Labrador
Organizations based in Canada with royal patronage
Rowing competitions in Canada
Sport in St. John's, Newfoundland and Labrador
1816 establishments in Newfoundland
Recurring sporting events established in 1816
Annual sporting events in Canada
Events of National Historic Significance (Canada)